Xylophanes norfolki is a moth of the  family Sphingidae. It is known from the Galapagos Islands.

It is similar to Xylophanes tersa and related species, but the pattern and form of the forewing upperside is different. The underside of the abdomen is purplish-brown, while the forewing upperside has a dark brown ground colour and the forewing and hindwing underside ground colour is dark orange. There are pale yellow spots on the hindwing upperside, while the ground colour dark orange.

Adults are on wing in February and June and possibly again from September to October.

The larvae feed on Psychotria rufipes.

References

norfolki
Moths described in 1962
Endemic fauna of the Galápagos Islands
Moths of South America